Goncalı railway station is a railway station in the village of Goncali, Turkey. TCDD Taşımacılık operates a daily inter-city train from Denizli to Eskişehir, as well as regional train service to İzmir and Söke. Goncalı station was opened on 13 October 1889 by the Ottoman Railway Company.

References

Railway stations in Denizli Province
Railway stations opened in 1889
1889 establishments in the Ottoman Empire